is a former Japanese football player.

Career

Albirex Niigata
After spending two seasons in Singapore's S.League playing for Albirex Niigata Singapore FC Okuyama signed for his former club and the main team of Albirex Niigata, Albirex Niigata in the J1 League.

Club statistics

References

External links
 

1991 births
Albirex Niigata players
Albirex Niigata Singapore FC players
Association football people from Tokyo
Association football midfielders
Expatriate footballers in Singapore
Living people
Japanese footballers
J1 League players
People from the Izu Islands
Sportspeople from Tokyo Metropolis